
Consort Yu may refer to:

Consorts with the surname Yu

China
Consort Yu (Xiang Yu's wife) (died 202 BC), consort of Western Chu
Beautiful Lady Yu (Han dynasty) (died 179), concubine of Emperor Shun of Han
Yu Wenjun (297–328), wife of Emperor Ming of Jin
Yu Daolian (died 366), wife of Emperor Fei of Jin
Empress Yu (Northern Wei) (488?–507), wife of Emperor Xuanwu of Northern Wei 
Queen Yu (Wuyue) ( 970s), wife of Qian Chu
Consort Yu (Yongle) (died 1421), concubine of the Yongle Emperor

Korea
Several of Taejo of Goryeo's consorts
Queen Sinhye
Queen Sinmyeongsunseong
Queen Jeongdeok
Lady Dongyangwon
Queen Munhye, wife of Great King Munwon
Queen Heonui, wife of Gyeongjong of Goryeo
Queen Mundeok (died before 997), wife of Seongjong of Goryeo
Queen Seonjeong (Mokjong) (died  1009), wife of Mokjong of Goryeo
Queen Wonyong ( 1013), consort of Hyeonjong of Goryeo
Queen Myeongui (died 1112), wife of Sukjong of Goryeo
Queen Anhye (died 1232), wife of Gojong of Goryeo
Queen Wondeok (died 1239), consort of Gangjong of Goryeo
Princess Gyeongchang (died after 1277), consort of Wonjong of Goryeo
Deposed Queen Yu (1576–1623), wife of Gwanghaegun of Joseon
Grand Princess Consort Munhwa (1598–1676), wife of Grand Prince Neungwon of Joseon

Consorts with the title Consort Yu
Imperial Noble Consort Chunque ( 1690–1785), concubine of the Yongzheng Emperor
Noble Consort Yu (1714–1792), concubine of the Qianlong Emperor
Consort Yu (Borjigin) (1730–1774), concubine of the Qianlong Emperor
Concubine Yu (Daoguang) (1816–1897), concubine of the Daoguang Emperor
Imperial Noble Consort Xianzhe (1856–1932), concubine of the Tongzhi Emperor